Nicholas David Offerman (born June 26, 1970) is an American actor, comedian, writer, and producer. He became widely known for his role as Ron Swanson in the NBC sitcom Parks and Recreation (2009–2015), for which he received the Television Critics Association Award for Individual Achievement in Comedy and was twice nominated for the Critics' Choice Television Award for Best Supporting Actor in a Comedy Series. 

Following the end of Parks and Recreation, Offerman appeared in the second season of the FX dark comedy-drama series Fargo (2015), for which he received a nomination for the Critics' Choice Television Award for Best Supporting Actor in a Movie/Miniseries. He also portrayed McDonald's co-founder Richard McDonald in The Founder (2016) and began co-hosting the NBC reality competition series Making It (2018–present) with Amy Poehler; the duo received two nominations for the Primetime Emmy Award for Outstanding Host for a Reality or Competition Program.

Offerman's other work includes executive producing and starring in the film The House of Tomorrow (2017). He voiced Agent Powers on Gravity Falls (2012–2016) and has provided voice acting work for The Lego Movie franchise (2014–present), Hotel Transylvania 2 (2015), Ice Age: Collision Course (2016), and the Sing film franchise (2016–present). He also hosted Have a Good Trip: Adventures in Psychedelics (2020). He starred as Bill in the acclaimed third episode of the HBO series The Last of Us (2023), with some critics naming it potentially the best performance of his career.

Early life
Nicholas David Offerman was born in Joliet, Illinois, on June 26, 1970, the son of nurse Cathy (née Roberts) and social studies teacher Ric Offerman. His father taught at a high school in Channahon. Offerman was raised Catholic in nearby Minooka, where he attended Minooka Community High School. He received a BFA from the University of Illinois Urbana–Champaign in 1993. That year, he and a group of fellow students co-founded the Chicago theatre company Defiant Theatre.

Career

Acting
Offerman lived in Chicago in the mid-1990s, where he participated with theater companies such as Steppenwolf, Goodman, and Wisdom Bridge. At Steppenwolf, he also worked as a fight choreographer and master carpenter. During this time, Offerman became acquainted with Amy Poehler, who was heavily involved with the Chicago improv comedy scene.

In 2003, he married Will & Grace actress Megan Mullally. Offerman has also appeared on her talk show, The Megan Mullally Show. At the same time, he began appearing on television as a plumber on Will & Grace on its fourth season's Thanksgiving episode, on The King of Queens, in three episodes of 24, and in an episode of The West Wing. Prior to Parks and Recreation, his most prominent role was as a factory worker and Benny Lopez's love interest Randy McGee on George Lopez. He appeared twice on Gilmore Girls, in 2003's "The Festival of Living Art" and 2005's "Always a Godmother, Never a God" and in the third-season episode of Monk, "Mr. Monk and the Election" as a helper for the campaign of Natalie Teeger. In 2007, Offerman co-starred in the Comedy Central series American Body Shop.

In 2009, The Office producers Michael Schur and Greg Daniels offered Offerman a regular supporting role in their NBC sitcom Parks and Recreation: that of Ron Swanson, the deadpan, government-hating, libertarian head of a city parks department and boss of Amy Poehler's character Leslie Knope. Slate magazine declared Offerman "Parks and Recreation secret weapon", and said he regularly stole scenes and "has a gift for understated physical comedy." The role weaves antagonism and political philosophy with humanity, while the intense libertarian philosophy the character lives out is often played off against the equally intense social liberalism and "do-gooder" mentality of Poehler's character. Offerman said that supporting parts such as that of Parks and Recreation are his ideal roles, and that he draws particular inspiration from Reverend Jim Ignatowski, the character played by Christopher Lloyd in the sitcom Taxi.

Offerman has also been featured in the Adult Swim series Childrens Hospital with Rob Corddry and Rob Huebel. He is the voice of Axe Cop in the animated series of the same name that premiered on July 27, 2013. In the same year, Offerman portrayed Johnny Cool in the "Boston" episode of Derek Waters' Drunk History on Comedy Central. In 2014, he portrayed a lovesick German talk show host in The Decemberists' video, Make You Better . The same year, he also appeared in a short film The Gunfighter directed by Eric Kissack. Nick played the role of the narrator of the film where the actors of the film break the fourth wall and are able to hear the narrator.

Offerman can be seen on the big screen briefly as a construction worker in City of Angels (1998) and later in other films such as November (2004), Cursed (2005), Miss Congeniality 2: Armed and Fabulous (2005), Sin City (2005), The Men Who Stare at Goats (2009) and The Kings of Summer (2013). He also appeared in the 2006 film Wristcutters: A Love Story as a cop who attempts to arrest Shannyn Sossamon's character, Mikal. 2012 saw him in two film roles, as 21 Jump Street'''s Deputy Chief Hardy and in Casa de Mi Padre as DEA Agent Parker. He reprised his role as Deputy Chief Hardy in 22 Jump Street two years later. Additionally, he starred in and produced an independent film, Somebody Up There Likes Me (2012), shot in Austin, Texas. He appeared in the 2013 comedy We're the Millers, which starred Jason Sudeikis and Jennifer Aniston, and voiced MetalBeard in The Lego Movie. Offerman conceived of and starred in punk band FIDLAR's 2013 video for their song "Cocaine". Offerman also played an alcoholic college guidance counselor in Believe Me. Offerman played the recurring role Karl Weathers in the second season of Fargo (2015). Offerman voiced Grandpa Mike alongside wife Megan Mullally who voiced Grandma Linda in Hotel Transylvania 2 (2015). He portrayed the first establisher of McDonald's, Dick McDonald, in The Founder (2016). Offerman also starred in alternative rock band They Might Be Giants' 2018 video for their song "The Greatest".

In 2023, Offerman appeared in the third episode of the HBO series The Last of Us as Bill. His performance, along with that of his co-star Murray Bartlett, was critically acclaimed, with some critics naming it a career-best performance, and Dais Johnston of Inverse labelled them as "Emmy-worthy".

Woodworking
In addition to acting, Offerman is also a professional boat builder and has a side business as a wood craftsman. Offerman makes furniture and other wooden structures such as canoes and boats at his woodshop. He also released an instructional DVD in 2008 titled Fine Woodstrip Canoe Building with Nick Offerman, shot by Jimmy DiResta. DiResta's pay for shooting the DVD was a canoe, the second Offerman has built. He has been featured in, and contributed articles to, the magazine Fine Woodworking.

Writing
Offerman has released four semi-autobiographical publications: the first, Paddle Your Own Canoe: One Man's Fundamentals for Delicious Living was released in 2013; his second, Gumption: Relighting the Torch of Freedom with America's Gutsiest Troublemakers, was released May 26, 2015; the third, Good Clean Fun: Misadventures in Sawdust at Offerman Woodshop, was released October 18, 2016. His fourth book, Where the Deer and the Antelope Play: The Pastoral Observations of One Ignorant American Who Loves to Walk Outside, was released October 12, 2021. He has also narrated all four as audiobooks.

Comedy tours
In 2017, Offerman launched his Full Bush Tour which consisted of 28 shows across the U.S. and Canada. His All Rise Tour kicked off on July 20, 2019, in Thackerville and continued through the rest of 2019, hitting major cities: Chicago, San Francisco, Washington DC, Philadelphia, New York, Detroit, and Atlanta.

Theatre

In 2014, Offerman and Mullally starred alongside each other in the off-Broadway one-act play, Annapurna. The two play an estranged couple that reunites one last time. In 2015, Offerman starred as Ignatius J. Reilly in a theatrical adaptation of A Confederacy of Dunces with the Huntington Theatre Company.

Personal life
Offerman married actress Megan Mullally on September 20, 2003. They met while co-starring in the play The Berlin Circle with the Evidence Room Theatre Company, and married after dating for 18 months. They have worked together on series and films such as Will & Grace, Parks and Recreation, The Kings of Summer, Smashed, Hotel Transylvania 2, Bob's Burgers, and The Great North. They began a live comedy tour in 2016, the theme of which was their sex life. In 2019, they started In Bed with Nick and Megan'', a podcast discussing their personal lives while interviewing guests.

When asked whether he is a libertarian like his character Ron Swanson, Offerman said in 2017, "While I admire the philosophy of the libertarian mindset, I think it's proven to be ineffectual in actual governance. So no, I'm not. I'm a free-thinking American." He described Donald Trump as racist and sexist during the 2016 U.S. presidential election, but also mocked Trump's opponent Hillary Clinton for her private email controversy. Upon voting in the 2020 Democratic Party presidential primaries, he tweeted a photo of himself with an "I Voted" sticker, adding the caption "#VoteWarren" in reference to Democratic presidential candidate Elizabeth Warren. That year, he also tweeted his support for Democratic candidate Charles Booker in the U.S. Senate Democratic primary in Kentucky.

Filmography

Film

Television

Theatre

Video games

Theme park attractions

References

External links

 

 
 

1970 births
20th-century American comedians
21st-century American comedians
20th-century American male actors
21st-century American male actors
Actors from Joliet, Illinois
American carpenters
American male film actors
American male stage actors
American male television actors
American male voice actors
American podcasters
American woodworkers
Living people
Male actors from Chicago
People from Minooka, Illinois
Writers from Joliet, Illinois
University of Illinois College of Fine and Applied Arts alumni
Catholics from Illinois
Comedians from Illinois